Bubbling Over (1923–1938) was an American thoroughbred racehorse and sire, best known for winning the 1926 Kentucky Derby.

Background
Bred in Kentucky, Bubbling Over was sired by English stakes winner North Star out of the mare Beaming Beauty, who in turn was sired by Belmont Stakes winner Sweep. He was owned by Colonel Bradley of Idle Hour Stock Farm.

Racing career
Bubbling Over was never out of the money in 13 starts. In a year when the Preakness Stakes was run before the Kentucky Derby (May 10 and May 15, respectively), Bubbling Over, who did not enter the 1926 Preakness Stakes, won the 1926 Kentucky Derby. He ran first in a field of 13, winning by five lengths over second-place finisher Bagenbaggage, with a time of 2:03 4/5. Bubbling Over did not race again, due to lameness.

Retirement
Upon retirement, Bubbling Over was very successful not only as a sire but as a broodmare sire.  Among his progeny were Kentucky Derby winner Burgoo King; Baby League, dam of Striking, 1961 Broodmare of the Year; Hildene, dam of Preakness Stakes winner Hill Prince; and stakes winner Biologist.  Baby League was also the dam of Busher, a filly who was the 1945 Horse of the Year.

Bubbling Over died in 1938 and is buried at Darby Dan Farm in Lexington, Kentucky.

Pedigree

Sources
 Pedigree & Partial Stats
 Darby Dan Farm

References

1923 racehorse births
1938 racehorse deaths
Racehorses bred in Kentucky
Racehorses trained in the United States
Horse monuments
Kentucky Derby winners
Thoroughbred family 8-h